is a Japanese female baseball player (infielder) and manager.

Kataoka graduated from Ryutsu Keizai University Faculty of Economics Faculty of Business.

Currently, she belongs to the community people baseball club team Ibaraki Golden Golds. As a tarento, Kataoka belongs to the entertainment office Sato-kikaku where the inquiries of the same team are established.

Television

Radio

Advertisements

Posters

Photo albums

References

External links
 
 

Japanese female baseball players
Managers of baseball teams in Japan
Player-coaches
Avex Group talents
People from Kumamoto
1986 births
Living people